31st Division may refer to:

 31st Division (German Empire), a unit of the Imperial German Army
 31st SS Volunteer Grenadier Division, a unit of the German Army
 31st Division (Imperial Japanese Army), a unit of the Imperial Japanese Army
 31 Infantry Division Calabria, a unit of the Italian Army
 31st Division (United Kingdom), a unit of the United Kingdom Army
 31st Infantry Division (Russian Empire), a unit of the Russian Empire
 21st Guards Motor Rifle Division (31st Guards Rifle Division), a unit of the Soviet Army
 31st Infantry Division (United States), a unit of the United States Army

 Armoured divisions 
 31st Indian Armoured Division, a unit of British India during World War II
 31st Armored Division (Israel), a reservist armored division in Israel that fought in the Six-Day War
 31st Tank Division (Soviet Union), a unit of the Soviet Army

 Aviation divisions 
 31st Air Division, a unit of the United States Air Force

See also
 31st Group (disambiguation)
 31st Brigade (disambiguation)
 31st Regiment (disambiguation)
 31st Battalion (disambiguation)
 31st Squadron (disambiguation)